Milton Schwartz may refer to:

Milton Schwartz (spy), American
Milton Lewis Schwartz (1920–2005), U.S. federal judge
A character in Marjorie Morningstar (novel)